Richard E. Parks (October 28, 1943 – August 19, 1978) was an American basketball player. He played college basketball for Saint Louis.

A 6'7" forward, Parks played college basketball at Saint Louis University.

Parks was drafted by the Cincinnati Royals in the 5th round (7th pick, 47th overall) of the 1966 NBA draft.

Parks played on the 1967–68 Pittsburgh Pipers team that won the 1968 ABA Championship.

Parks was shot and killed at a bar in St. Louis on August 19, 1978 at age 34.

References

External links
Basketball-Reference.com Rich Parks page

1943 births
1978 deaths
American men's basketball players
Cincinnati Royals draft picks
Deaths by firearm in Missouri
Pittsburgh Pipers players
Saint Louis Billikens men's basketball players
Shooting guards
Basketball players from St. Louis
People murdered in Missouri
American murder victims